The Secret of Dr. Mabuse or The Death Ray of Dr. Mabuse (German: Die Todesstrahlen des Dr. Mabuse) is a 1964 Franco-German-Italian international co-production science fiction Eurospy crime film directed by Hugo Fregonese and Victor De Santis and starring Peter van Eyck, O.E. Hasse and Yvonne Furneaux. It was a co-production between France, Italy and West Germany. The film was the last in a series of films which had revived the Weimar era character Doctor Mabuse.

The film's sets were designed by the art directors Ernst H. Albrecht and Wilhelm Vorwerg. It was shot at the Spandau Studios in Berlin.

Plot
British Secret Service agent Major Anders investigates Professor Larsen who has invented a death ray on his island. Included among the parties trying to obtain it is the arch criminal Dr. Mabuse. Anders leads an army of frogmen to stop Larsen and Mabuse.

Cast
 Peter van Eyck as Maj. Bob Anders 
 O.E. Hasse as Prof. Larsen 
 Yvonne Furneaux as Gilda Larsen 
 Rika Dialina as Judy 
 Wolfgang Preiss as Dr. Mabuse's ghost 
 Walter Rilla as Prof. Pohland 
 Ernst Schroder as Chefarzt 
 Robert Beatty as Col. Matson 
 Valéry Inkijinoff as Dr. Krishna 
 Dieter Eppler as Kaspar 
 Claudio Gora as Direktor Botani alias "Dr. Mabuse" 
 Gustavo Rojo as Mario Monta 
 Massimo Pietrobon as Jason Monta 
 Charles Fawcett as Cmdr. Adams 
 Leo Genn as Adm. Quency 
 Yoko Tani as Mercedes

Release
The Secret of Dr. Mabuse was released in West Germany on 18 September 1964.

Reception
Creature Feature gave the movie two stars, calling it dreary.

References

Bibliography 
 Haase, Holger: The Many Masks of Dr. Mabuse: Mabuse in the 1960s. (Kindle 2020)
 Reimer, Robert C. & Reimer, Carol J. The A to Z of German Cinema. Scarecrow Press, 2010.

External links 
 

1964 films
1960s crime thriller films
1960s science fiction films
1960s spy thriller films
Dr. Mabuse films
Films directed by Hugo Fregonese
Films set in London
Films set in Malta
1960s German-language films
French black-and-white films
French sequel films
German black-and-white films
German science fiction films
German sequel films
German spy thriller films
German crime thriller films
West German films
Italian black-and-white films
Italian sequel films
Films shot at Spandau Studios
1960s German films